KRT24 is a keratin gene.